Bokaro Assembly constituency   is an assembly constituency in  the Indian state of Jharkhand.

Members of Assembly 
1995: Aklu Ram Mahto, Rashtriya Janata Dal
2000: Samresh Singh, Independent
2005: Israel Ansari, Indian National Congress
2009: Samresh Singh, Jharkhand Vikas Morcha (Prajatantrik)
2014: Biranchi Narayan, Bharatiya Janata Party
2019: Biranchi Narayan, Bharatiya Janata Party

See also
List of constituencies of the Jharkhand Legislative Assembly

References

Assembly constituencies of Jharkhand
Bokaro Steel City